The 2013 National Conference League was the 28th season of the National Conference League, the top league for British amateur rugby league clubs.

Premier Division
The Premier Division featured three new clubs:
Egremont Rangers, promoted as champions from 2012 NCL Division One
Castleford Lock Lane, promoted from 2012 NCL Division One
York Acorn, promoted from 2012 NCL Division One

League table

Play-offs

Division One
Division One featured five new clubs:
East Leeds, promoted as champions from 2012 NCL Division Two
Waterhead Warriors, promoted from 2012 NCL Division Two
Dewsbury Celtic, promoted from 2012 NCL Division Two
Oulton Raiders, relegated from 2012 NCL Premier Division
Saddleworth Rangers, relegated from 2012 NCL Premier Division

League table

Division Two
Division Two featured four new clubs:
 Leigh East, relegated from 2012 NCL Premier Division
 Castleford Panthers, relegated from 2012 NCL Division One
 Oldham St Annes, relegated from 2012 NCL Division One
 Stanningley, relegated from 2012 NCL Division One

Widnes West Bank resigned from the league mid-season; their results were expunged.

League table

Division Three
Division Three featured ten new clubs:
 Crosfields, relegated from 2012 NCL Division Two
 Featherstone Lions, relegated from 2012 NCL Division Two
 Heworth, relegated from 2012 NCL Division Two
 Seven new teams were also granted membership to the National Conference League: Blackbrook, Hindley, Kells, Peterlee Pumas, Pilkington Recs, Wigan St Cuthberts and Woolston Rovers.

League table

Cup results
Conference Challenge Trophy:

 Leigh Miners Rangers 42–14 Wigan St Patricks

Notes

References 

National Conference League seasons
National Conference League